Avenger is a Space Invaders clone published on cartridge by Commodore in 1981 for the VIC-20. The game uses multicolor graphics and supports keyboard or joystick control. The player starts with 3 bases (lives) and gets new base at 1500 points.

A year later it was released for the Commodore 64.

Reception
In Creative Computing, David Busch wrote, "Those who have played hundreds of games of Space Invaders on many different computer systems will probably tire of this rather quickly."

Reviewing the German release under "Alpha-Alarm" title, TeleMatch magazine compared the gameplay with Space Invaders from Atari as easy and not so thoughtful.

References

1981 video games
VIC-20 games
Commodore 64 games
Fixed shooters
Space Invaders
Video game clones
Video games developed in the United States